Kamal Haasan is an Indian film actor, screenwriter, film director, film producer, politician and choreographer who works primarily in Tamil cinema. At the age of 6, he debuted as a child actor in the 1960 Tamil film Kalathur Kannamma, directed by A. Bhimsingh, which won him the President's Gold Medal. Since then he has acted in over 230 films in Tamil and other languages including Malayalam, Telugu, Hindi, Kannada, and Bengali. After a few projects as a child artist he took a break to continue his education. He later concentrated on dance choreography and worked as an assistant choreographer. During this time, he made uncredited appearances in a few films which he worked on.

In 1973, Haasan landed his first adult role as Thiagu in the film Arangetram by K. Balachander, whom the actor considers his mentor. He continued to act in minor roles in several films such as Sollathaan Ninaikkiren (1973) and Naan Avanillai (1974), most of which were directed by Balachander. His breakthrough as an independent lead actor came with the 1974 Malayalam film Kanyakumari. His work in it won him the Filmfare Award for Best Actor (Malayalam). Following that, he starred in a series of films in both languagesTamil and Malayalam. His breakthrough in Tamil cinema came with Balachander's Apoorva Raagangal (1975) and AS.Prakasam's Pattaampoochi (1975); Apoorva Raagangal earned him a second Filmfare Award, his first in Tamil. Between 1974 and 1978, he won six Filmfare Awards including four consecutive wins for the Best Actor (Tamil). Haasan turned producer for Raja Paarvai (1981), in which he played the lead role of a blind musician. The film was produced under the "Haasan Brothers" banner which was later renamed Raaj Kamal Films International.

Haasan debuted in Bollywood with Balachander's Ek Duuje Ke Liye (1981), which was a remake of his 1978 Telugu film Maro Charitra. His role as a school teacher who looks after an amnesic girl in Moondram Pirai (1982) won him several accolades, including the Best Actor honours at the National Film Awards and Tamil Nadu State Film Awards. He then starred in the Panchu Arunachalam-written Sakalakala Vallavan, which expanded Kamal's popularity from classes to the masses. His role in Ramesh Sippy's Hindi film Saagar (1985), a triangular love story, was nominated in both Best Actor and Best Supporting Actor categories at the 33rd Filmfare Awards. Under Raaj Kamal Films International, he produced films such as: Vikram (1986), Apoorva Sagodharargal (1989), Thevar Magan (1992) and Hey Ram (2000). As a producer he won a Filmfare Award and National Film Award for Apoorva Sagodharargal and Thevar Magan. Seven films featuring Kamal have been submitted by India to the Academy Awards for Best Foreign Language Film, the most for any actor in India. His work Vishwaroopam (2013), which he also produced and directed, won two awards at the 60th National Film Awards. He has starred in both blockbuster and art house films.

As actor

As director, producer,  and writer 

List of films distributed by Kamal Haasan

Other crew positions

Unreleased films

Television

As a host and guest

Music videos

Documentaries

See also 
 Kamal Haasan's unrealized projects 
 List of awards and nominations received by Kamal Haasan
 Kamal Haasan discography

Notes

References

Bibliography

External links 
 

Male actor filmographies
Indian filmographies
Filmography
Director filmographies